Ban Nokhvod (also Romanized as Bān Nokhvod; also known as Bān-e Khvod, Bān Khvod, Bā Nokhvod, Karamkhānī, and Pānkhūd) is a village in Gurani Rural District, Gahvareh District, Dalahu County, Kermanshah Province, Iran. At the 2006 census, its population was 80, in 22 families.

References 

Populated places in Dalahu County